Cindy Cheung may refer to:

 Cindy Cheung (actress) (born 1970), Chinese American actress 
 Cindy Cheung (television presenter) (born 1984), Chinese Canadian TV host